Sarvabad (also Romanized as Sarvābād; also known as Sarrābād, Saulāwa, and Sūlāveh) is a city in Kurdistan Province. At the 2006 census, its population was 3,707, in 955 families. The city is populated by Kurds.

References

Towns and villages in Sarvabad County
Cities in Kurdistan Province
Kurdish settlements in Kurdistan Province